Haji Rahmanullah khan (born; 1941 – 14 May 2015), was Pakistani politician from Swabi District who had been a member of the National Assembly of Pakistan from 1990 to 1993 and 1997 to 1999.

References

1941 births
2015 deaths
Pashtun people
People from Swabi District
Awami National Party politicians
Pakistani MNAs 1990–1993
Pakistani MNAs 1997–1999